This is a list of cricketers who have played cricket for the Andhra cricket team.

A
 Bandaru Ayyappa (born 1992)

 Shaik Basha (born 1993)
 K. S. Bharat (born 1993)
 Ricky Bhui (born 1996)

C
 Dasari Chaitanya (born 1997)
 V. Chamundeswaranath (born 1959)
 Gonnabattula Chiranjeevi (born 1992)

H
 Kakani Harish (born 1991)
 Ashwin Hebbar (born 1995)

J
 M. Jairam (born 1937)

K
 Mohammad Kaif (born 1980)
 Doddapaneni Kalyankrishna
 S. K. Kamaruddin (born 1992)
 Shoaib Md Khan (born 1991)
 Dasi Prabhu Kiran (born 1989)
 Sneha Kishore (born 1993)
 Jyothi Krishna (born 1990)
 Ajay Kumar (born 1989)
 Dasari Swaroop Kumar (born 1986)
 Mahendra Kumar (born 1939)
 Pawan Kumar (born 1970)
 Prasanth Kumar (born 1991)
 Siva Kumar (born 1990)
 Timmeri Kumar (born 1992)

M
 Vijay Manjrekar (1931–1983)
 Amol Muzumdar (born 1974)

N
 C. K. Nayudu (died 1967)
 C. S. Nayudu

P
 Komadur Padmanabhan (born 1937)
 Amit Pathak (born 1972)
 Rajesh Pawar (born 1979)
 A. G. Pradeep (born 1987)
 L. N. Prasad Reddy (born 1977)
 Mudi Prajith (born 1989)
 M. S. K. Prasad (born 1975)
 G. A. Pratapkumar (born 1956)

R
 Prithvi Raj (born 1998)
 Karthik Raman (born 1997)
 Bajina Ramprasad (1940–2016)
 Balaji Rao (born 1938)
 Bhavaraju Venkata Krishna Rao (born 1930)
 Gnaneshwara Rao (born 1984)
 Mandapati Subba Rao
 Narayana Rao (born 1940)
 Yalaka Venugopal Rao (born 1982)
 Ambati Rayudu (born 1985)
 Girinath Reddy (born 1998)

S
 Manoj Sai (born 1982)
 K. V. Sasikanth (born 1995)
 Syed Shahabuddin (born 1979)
 Karan Shinde (born 1997)
 Hanumappa Shivraj (born 1990)
 Bukkapatnam Siddharth (born 1990)
 Maheshwar Singh (born 1946)
 Siva Charan Singh (born 1993)
 Koripalli Sreekanth (born 1992)
 Sirla Srinivas (born 1992)
 Murumulla Sriram (born 1992)
 CV Stephen (born 1993)
 Bodavarapu Sudhakar (born 1991)
 Tirumalasetti Suman (born 1983)
 Bodapati Sumanth (born 1988)
 Marripuri Suresh (born 1983)

V
 Paidikalva Vijaykumar (born 1986)
 T Vamsikrishna
 Venkatapathy Raju
 Aatla Vinay Kumar Reddy

References

<ref>
Andhra cricketers

cricketers